Elke Rehder (born 1953) is a German artist living in Barsbüttel Germany.

Life and work 

Elke Rehder studied at the Heatherley School of Fine Art in London (1979–80). During that time she was predominantly active as a sculptor, where she created objects from iron, steel, copper, granite, marble as well as small bronzes in lost-wax castings. During her stay in London the symbolism of chess becomes a centrepoint in her artwork, following a statement by Boris Spassky: "Chess is like life". Since then, Elke Rehder creates installation art and land art projects centered around chess.

In 1991 Elke Rehder started the international cultural project "Kulturgesellschaft Europa", which is accompanied by statements of important personalities from the cultural, economical and political world. Since then she started to collect European antique prints and illustrated newspapers. 2014 the Elke Rehder collection contained more than 50,000 historical pictures. 1992 she was honored with the award "Bernhard-Kaufmann-Kunstpreis"  in Worpswede.

From 1991 to 1993 she deepened her knowledge of painting at the Federal Academy of Cultural Education in Wolfenbüttel and of graphic arts at the Hamburg University of Applied Sciences.

Artists' books 

Since 1993 Elke Rehder concentrates on literature and lyric poetry and founded the Elke Rehder Presse for printmaking. With her artists' books she participated several times at the Leipzig Book Fair, the Frankfurt Book Fair and the largest book fair for small publishers and artistic hand press operators in Europe "Mainzer Minipressen-Messe" (International Book Fair for Small Publishers and Private Presses). At the international antiquarian book and arts fair "Quod Libet" in Hamburg she presented a portfolio with etchings to The Trial by Franz Kafka and woodcuts to The Royal Game by Stefan Zweig. Beside her fine press publications Elke Rehder creates numerous painted books, book objects and paper art objects.

Solo exhibitions (selected) 

1992 Reinbek Castle, Reinbek, Germany
1993 Federal Ministry of Economics and Technology, Bonn / Berlin, Germany
1993 Gallery Art und Weise, Heide, Germany
1995 Stichting Ateliers, Driebergen, Netherlands
1999 Eutiner Landesbibliothek, Eutin, Germany
2000 Gallery Silvia Umla, Völklingen, Germany
2001 Haus der Kultur und Bildung, Neubrandenburg, Germany
2003 Beeskow Castle, Beeskow, Germany
2003 Saarland University, Saarbrücken, Germany
2006 Gottfried Wilhelm Leibniz Bibliothek, Hanover, Germany

Group exhibitions (selected) 

1995 Provinciaal Museum voor Moderne Kunst, Oostend, Belgium
1997 Kunsthalle Düsseldorf, Düsseldorf, Germany
1997 Internationale Kunstmesse "Kunstmarkt Dresden", Dresden, Germany
1998 Austrian National Library, Vienna, Austria
1998 Gallery Lang, Vienna, Austria
1998 PAPER ART exhibition Speicherstadt, Hamburg, Germany
1999 Germanisches Nationalmuseum, Nuremberg, Germany
2003 6th Triennale Mondiale d'Estampes, Chamalières, France
2005 Museum für Kunst und Gewerbe, Hamburg, Germany
2009 State Library of Schleswig-Holstein, Kiel, Germany

Works in collections (selected) 
Basel University Library, British Library, Deutsches Buch- und Schriftmuseum, (Leipzig, Germany), Museum of Modern Literature (Marbach, Germany), Duchess Anna Amalia Library, German National Library, Germanisches Nationalmuseum (Nuremberg, Germany), Goethe University Frankfurt, Herzog August Bibliothek, John G. White Collection in the Cleveland Public Library, Klingspor Museum, Koninklijke Bibliotheek, National Library of the Netherlands, Library of Congress, Lothar Schmid Chess Collection (Bamberg, Germany), Museum Meermanno-Westreenianum, Saxon State Library, Swiss National Library, Württembergische Landesbibliothek (Stuttgart, Germany)

Notes

External links 
 Official website
 Elke Rehder – Chess and Art

1953 births
German sculptors
German women artists
Living people
People from Stormarn (district)